Metastenodiscus is an extinct genus of Triassic trepostome bryozoans of the family Stenoporidae. It is distinct from Stenodiscus because of the presence of cystiphragms and the presence of a wide range of sizes of acanthostyles.

References

Prehistoric bryozoan genera
Triassic
Trepostomata